Elia Rokowailoa, known also as Willie Rokowailoa (born 22 July 1958) is a former Fijian dual-code rugby player. He played as fly-half. He was also a soldier.

Career
His first cap for the Fiji was against Samoa, at Apia, on 12 June 1982. He was also part of the 1987 Rugby World Cup squad, where he played three matches. He still played in the national team, although not being called in the 1991 Rugby World Cup Fijian squad. His last international cap was against Tonga, at Nuku'alofa, on 17 July 1993.
Along with Mosese Taga, Salacieli Naivilawasa, Usaia Daunivalu, Lai Tawake, Alifereti Dere, Nemani Matirewa, Esala Teleni, Pauliasi Tabulutu, and Fotu Waqabaca, Rokowailoa was also a member of the Suva team that won the coveted Farebrother-Sullivan Trophy from Nadi in 1988.

Notes

External links

Fiji international rugby union players
Fijian rugby union players
Rugby union fly-halves
1958 births
Living people
I-Taukei Fijian people